The following is a list of events affecting American television during 1999. Events listed include television series debuts, finales, cancellations, and channel initiations, closures and re-brandings, as well as information about controversies and disputes.

Events

January

February

March

April

May

June

July

August

September

October

November

December

Programs

Debuts

Ending this year

Entering syndication this year

Resuming this year

Changes of network affiliation

Made-for-TV movies and miniseries

Television stations

Station launches

Network affiliation changes

Station closures

Births

Deaths

See also
 1999 in the United States
 List of American films of 1999

References

External links
List of 1999 American television series at IMDb

 
1990s in American television